Historical determinism is the stance that events are historically predetermined or currently constrained by various forces. Historical determinism can be understood in contrast to its negation, i.e. the rejection of historical determinism.

Some political philosophies (e.g. Stalinism, Maoism and Marxism), assert a historical materialism of either predetermination or constraint, or both.

Used as a pejorative, it is normally meant to designate a rigid finalist or mechanist conception of historical unfolding that makes the future appear as an inevitable and predetermined result of the past.

See also 

 Bad faith (existentialism)
 Cliodynamics
 Determinism
 Dialectical materialism
 Economic determinism
 False consciousness
 False necessity
 Free will
 Futurology
 Geographic determinism
 Geopolitics
 Hegelianism
 Human nature
 Kondratiev wave
 Marxism
 Millenarianism
 Myth of progress
 Self determination
 Technological determinism
 Whig history

Bibliography

External links 
 
 

 
Determinism
Marxism
Political theories
Theories of history